Tas Tappeh (also Romanized as Ţās Tappeh; also known as Tash Tepe) is a village in Sardaran Rural District, in the Central District of Kabudarahang County, Hamadan Province, Iran. At the 2006 census, its population was 318, in 67 families.

References 

Populated places in Kabudarahang County